The Journal of Hymenoptera Research is a peer-reviewed scientific journal covering systematics, taxonomy, and ecology of Hymenoptera. It was established in 1992, and transferred to publishing with Pensoft Publishers in 2011, under an open access system. According to the Journal Citation Reports, the journal has a 2020 impact factor of 1.733.

References

External links

 
 Journal of Hymenoptera Research at the Biodiversity Heritage Library

Entomology journals and magazines
Publications established in 1992
English-language journals
Creative Commons Attribution-licensed journals
Pensoft Publishers academic journals
Academic journals associated with learned and professional societies